Following is a list of municipal presidents of Puerto Vallarta, in the Mexican state of Jalisco:

References

Puerto Vallarta
Puerto Vallarta